Herbert Swift Carter (September 19, 1869 – October 25, 1927) was an American physician and writer.

Biography

Carter was born in Orange, New Jersey. He was educated at Lawrenceville School and the Dearborn Morgan School in Orange, New Jersey. He obtained his B.A. in 1892 from Princeton University. He studied medicine at Columbia University and graduated M.D. in 1895.

He took a post-graduate course at Berlin University researching pathology. On his return to the United States he established his private practice in New York City. Carter was an instructor in pathology at Cornell University Medical College for a year. He was assistant professor of clinical medicine at Columbia University, associate visiting physician of the NewYork–Presbyterian Hospital and consulting physician to the Lincoln Hospital.

Carter married Mabel Stewart Pettit in 1898, they had several children. He was a Fellow of the New York Academy of Medicine and member of the American Medical Association. He co-authored Nutrition and Clinical Dietetics which went through many editions. Medical reviews were positive and described it as a valuable reference textbook for dietitians and nurses.

Carter died after an operation for a peptic ulcer at Johns Hopkins Hospital.

Selected publications

Diet Lists of the Presbyterian Hospital, New York (1913)
Nutrition and Clinical Dietetics (with Paul E. Howe and Howard H. Mason, 1921)

References

Further reading

1869 births
1927 deaths
20th-century American physicians
American health and wellness writers
Columbia University Vagelos College of Physicians and Surgeons alumni
Diet food advocates
Dietitians
NewYork–Presbyterian Hospital physicians
People from Orange, New Jersey
Princeton University alumni